Dirk "Dick" Hendrikus Schoenaker (born 30 November 1952) is a retired Dutch football midfielder, who represented the Netherlands at the 1978 FIFA World Cup in Argentina, wearing the number three jersey.

Career
His football-career started at Wageningen and De Graafschap Doetinchem. He was bought by Ajax Amsterdam by leaving Ajax-coach Rinus Michels at the end of the 1975/1976 season. He went to Ajax summer 1976, simultaneously with Hans Erkens and Johan Zuidema and has been by far the most successful of the 3 midfielders, their first Ajax-coach being Tomislav Ivic. Schoenaker displayed unbridled energy at the midfield, a rumbled ability to run, the vigour as attacking midfielder to disturb players of the opponent (defensive work) sometimes reconquering balls, achieved a high quote in scored goals per match and had been a very sporting player.

Also he has been captain of Ajax (1983–1984 and 1984–1985, his 9th and final season at Ajax). In Schoenaker's 9 seasons at Ajax, he won 6 Dutch Eredivisie championship titles (during the 1976–77, 1978–79, 1979–80, 1981–82, 1982–83, 1984–85 seasons) and 2 Dutch Cups (KNVB-Cups) (during the 1978–79, 1982–83 seasons). In the period between 1976 and 1985, Ajax also lost 3 Dutch Cup-finals (KNVB Cup-finals) (during the 1977–78, 1979–80, and 1980–81 seasons).

European successes were scarce during this period; the two best achievements were: a semi-final finish in the European Champions Cup during the 1979–80 season, and a quarter-final finish in the European Champions Cup I during the 1977–78 season. During the 1978–79 season Ajax was eliminated in the 3rd round of UEFA Cup, and during the 1984–85 season Red Boys Differdange was beaten 14–0 (returnmatch 1st round UEFA-Cup), a Dutch record, but in the 2nd round of that tournament Ajax was eliminated.

Summer 1985 Schoenaker went to play for FC Twente Enschede, where he ended his career. Schoenaker obtained a total number of thirteen caps, scoring six goals.

External links

1952 births
1978 FIFA World Cup players
AFC Ajax players
Association football midfielders
De Graafschap players
Dutch footballers
Eerste Divisie players
Eredivisie players
FC Wageningen players
Living people
Netherlands international footballers
People from Ede, Netherlands
Footballers from Gelderland
SBV Vitesse players
FC Twente players
AFC Ajax non-playing staff